Kirkby Ireleth is a civil parish in the South Lakeland District of Cumbria, England. It contains six listed buildings that are recorded in the National Heritage List for England. Of these, one is listed at Grade I, the highest of the three grades, two are at Grade II*, the middle grade, and the others are at Grade II, the lowest grade.  The parish contains the village of Kirkby-in-Furness and smaller settlements including Beck Side and Grizebeck, but is almost completely rural.  The former Furness Railway runs through the parish and a footbridge crossing the line at Kirkby-in-Furness railway station is listed.  The other listed buildings are a former manor house now a farmhouse, a country house and its garden wall, a church, and a barn.


Key

Buildings

Notes and references

Notes

Citations

Sources

Lists of listed buildings in Cumbria